Tiaan Kannemeyer (born 14 December 1978) is a South African former professional road cyclist. In 2002 he won the South African National Road Race Championships.

Major results

1999
 1st  Road race, All-Africa Games
2002
 1st  Road race, National Road Championships
 1st Stage 8 Herald Sun Tour
2003
 1st Overall Tour d'Egypte
1st Stage 3
 1st Stage 3 Tour of Queensland
 9th Overall Tour de la Manche
2004
 2nd Overall Giro del Capo
1st Stage 1
 2nd Time trial, National Road Championships
 2nd Gran Premio Industria e Commercio Artigianato Carnaghese
 4th Overall Tour de Langkawi
 9th Giro del Friuli
 9th GP Industria & Artigianato di Larciano
 10th Overall Settimana Ciclista Lombarda
2005
 1st Overall UCI Africa Tour
 National Road Championships
1st  Time trial
2nd Road race
 1st Overall Giro del Capo
1st Points classification
1st Stages 2 & 4
 3rd Overall Tour de Langkawi
 6th Overall Giro del Trentino
2006
 5th Overall Giro del Capo
2007
 2nd Powerade Dome 2 Dome Cycling Spectacular

References

1978 births
Living people
South African male cyclists
Cyclists at the 2004 Summer Olympics
Olympic cyclists of South Africa
White South African people
20th-century South African people
21st-century South African people